Charles Joseph Krebs   (born 17 September 1936) is a professor emeritus of population ecology in the University of British Columbia Department of Zoology. He is also Thinker-in-residence at the Institute for Applied Ecology at the University of Canberra, Australia.  He is renowned for his work on the fence effect, as well as his widely used ecology textbook Ecology: The Experimental Analysis of Distribution and Abundance.

Research
Krebs was interested mostly in smaller mammal ecology and in 1965 conducted an experiment on voles. He fenced in an area of grassland in an Indiana pasture about the size of a soccer field and observed what happened to the population of voles living inside the fenced area.
This was when he founded the widely known "Fence Effect". Within a year of living in the fenced area the voles had increased by about five times, which is much more than they would in an unfenced area. He then observed that the population experienced a crash, just like the unfenced populations do. Krebs believed this was due to social behaviour among the voles and could be applied to other animals like them. The voles had no place to migrate therefore the final crash seemed to stem from an increase of competition, aggressive behaviour, and decreased resources.

Krebs also worked in British Columbia and Northern Canada for over 40 years to look at cyclic populations of mammals. during this time he was able to transform the field of ecology from a descriptive science to an experimental discipline. For 20 years he studied the 10-year population cycle of snowshoe hares and their predators in the Yukon. He found that the population size of the snowshoe hares is regulated by predators such as the lynx, coyote, great horned owls and goshawks. 90% of their deaths were found to be due to these predators and almost none because of starvation and disease.

During his career, Krebs made the case for basic research.

A summary of Krebs work and his influence on students and colleagues (Judith H. Myers, Stan Boutin, Rudy Boonstra and Tony Sinclair can be seen in a series of seminars entitled "Krebs´ ecologists: on population regulation"

Select awards and recognition
 Fellow of the Royal Society of Canada, 1979
 Killam Senior Fellowship, 1985
 President's Medal, University of Helsinki, 1986
 Honorary doctorate, University of Lund, 1988
 Sir Frederick McMaster Senior Fellowship, CSIRO, Australia, 1992
 C. Hart Merriam Award, American Society of Mammalogists, 1993
 Fry Medal, Canadian Society of Zoologists, 1996
 Northern Science Award, Indian and Northern Affairs Canada, 2002
 Corresponding Member, Australian Academy of Science, 2002
 Eminent Ecologist Award, Ecological Society of America, 2002
 Fellow of the Royal Zoological Society of New South Wales 2013

References

External links
 Ecological Rants: Charles Krebs' Blogs

Living people
Canadian ecologists
Fellows of the Royal Society of Canada
1936 births
People from St. Louis
Fellows of the Australian Academy of Science
Academic staff of the University of British Columbia
Academic staff of the University of Canberra
University of Minnesota alumni
University of British Columbia alumni
Fellows of the Ecological Society of America
American zoologists
Canadian zoologists